The Dynamic Sport Rocket is a series of Polish paramotors designed and produced by Dynamic Sport of Kielce for powered paragliding. Now out of production, when it was available the aircraft was supplied complete and ready-to-fly.

Design and development
The Rocket was designed to comply with the US FAR 103 Ultralight Vehicles rules as well as European regulations. It features a paraglider-style wing, single-place accommodation and a single Radne Raket 120  engine in pusher configuration with a 3.25:1 ratio reduction drive and a  diameter propeller, depending on the model.

As is the case with all paramotors, take-off and landing is accomplished by foot. Inflight steering is accomplished via handles that actuate the canopy brakes, creating roll and yaw.

Variants
Rocket 100
Model with a Radne Raket 120  engine in pusher configuration with a 3.25:1 ratio reduction drive and a  diameter propeller.
Rocket 110
Model with a Radne Racket 120  engine in pusher configuration with a 3.25:1 ratio reduction drive and a  diameter propeller.
Rocket 115
Model with a Radne Racket 120  engine in pusher configuration with a 3.25:1 ratio reduction drive and a  diameter propeller.
Rocket 120
Model with a Radne Racket 120  engine in pusher configuration with a 3.25:1 ratio reduction drive and a  diameter propeller.

Specifications (Rocket 100)

See also
Dynamic Sport Climber

References

Rocket
2000s Polish ultralight aircraft
Single-engined pusher aircraft
Paramotors